Oplonia spinosa, the pricklybush, is a species of plant in the family Acanthaceae, endemic to several Caribbean islands. It is a spiny shrub ranging in height from dwarf to 3 meters, with curved spines 4–12 mm long, and leaves variable in size and shape.

Synonyms 
 Anthacanthus spinosus (Jacq.) Nees
 Jasminum coeruleum Kuntze
 Justicia spinosa Jacq.

References 
 Alain H. Liogier, Henri Alain Liogier, Descriptive Flora of Puerto Rico and Adjacent Islands: Acanthaceae to Compositae, page 42, Volume 5 of Descriptive Flora of Puerto Rico and Adjacent Islands: Spermatophyta, La Editorial, UPR, 1985. .
 GBIF entry
 ITIS entry
 USDA PLANTS entry
 JSTOR Plant Science entries

Acanthaceae
Plants described in 1838